Deir el-Bahari or Dayr al-Bahri is a complex of mortuary temples and tombs located on the west bank of the Nile, opposite the city of Luxor, Egypt. This is a part of the Theban Necropolis.

The first monument built at the site was the mortuary temple of Mentuhotep II of the Eleventh Dynasty. It was constructed during the 21st century BC.

During the Eighteenth Dynasty, Amenhotep I and Hatshepsut also built extensively at the site.

Mortuary temple of Nebhepetre Mentuhotep

Mentuhotep II, the Eleventh Dynasty king who reunited Egypt at the beginning of the Middle Kingdom, built a very unusual funerary complex. His mortuary temple was built on several levels in the great bay at Deir el-Bahari. It was approached by a 16-metre-wide (50-ft) causeway leading from a valley temple which no longer exists.

The mortuary temple itself consists of a forecourt and entrance gate, enclosed by walls on three sides, and a terrace on which stands a large square structure that may represent the primeval mound that arose from the waters of chaos. As the temple faces east, the structure is likely to be connected with the sun cult of Rê and the resurrection of the king.

From the eastern part of the forecourt, an opening called the Bab el-Hosan ('Gate of the Horseman') leads to an underground passage and an unfinished tomb or cenotaph containing a seated statue of the king. On the western side, tamarisk and sycamore trees were planted beside the ramp leading up to the terrace. At the back of the forecourt and terrace are colonnades decorated in relief with boat processions, hunts, and scenes showing the king's military achievements.

Statues of the Twelfth Dynasty king Senusret III were found here too.

The inner part of the temple was actually cut into the cliff and consists of a peristyle court, a hypostyle hall and an underground passage leading into the tomb itself. The cult of the dead king centred on the small shrine cut into the rear of the Hypostyle Hall.

The mastaba-like structure on the terrace is surrounded by a pillared ambulatory along the west wall, where the statue shrines and tombs of several royal wives and daughters were found. These royal princesses were the priestesses of Hathor, one of the main ancient Egyptian funerary deities. Although little remained of the king's own burial, six sarcophagi were retrieved from the tombs of the royal ladies (Ashayet, Henhenet, Kawit, Kemsit, Muyet and Sadhe). Each was formed of six slabs, held together at the corners by metal braces and carved in sunken relief. The sarcophagus of Queen Kawit, now in the Cairo Museum, is particularly fine.

The burial shaft and subsequent tunnel descend for 150 meters and end in a burial chamber 45 meters below the court. The chamber held a shrine, which once held the wooden coffin of Nebhepetre Mentuhotep. A great tree-lined court was reached by means of the processional causeway, leading up from the valley temple. Beneath the court, a deep shaft was cut which led to unfinished rooms believed to have been intended originally as the king's tomb. A wrapped image of the pharaoh was discovered in this area by Howard Carter. The temple complex also held six mortuary chapels and shaft tombs built for the pharaoh's wives and daughters.

Mortuary temple of Hatshepsut

The focal point of the Deir el-Bahari complex is the Djeser-Djeseru meaning "the Holy of Holies", the Mortuary Temple of Hatshepsut. It is a colonnaded structure, which was designed and implemented by Senenmut, royal steward and architect of Hatshepsut, to serve for her posthumous worship and to honor the glory of Amun.

Djeser-Djeseru sits atop a series of colonnaded terraces, reached by long ramps that once were graced with gardens. It is built into a cliff face that rises sharply above it, and is largely considered to be one of the "incomparable monuments of ancient Egypt".

The unusual form of Hatshepsut's temple is explained by the choice of location, in the valley basin of Deir el-Bahari, surrounded by steep cliffs. It was here, in about 2050 BC, that Mentuhotep II, the founder of the Middle Kingdom, laid out his sloping, terrace-shaped mortuary temple. The pillared galleries at either side of the central ramp of the Djeser Djeseru correspond to the pillar positions on two successive levels of the Temple of Mentuhotep.

Today the terraces of Deir el-Bahari only convey a faint impression of the original intentions of Senenmut. Most of the statue ornaments are missing – the statues of Osiris in front of the pillars of the upper colonnade, the sphinx avenues in front of the court, and the standing, sitting, and kneeling figures of Hatshepsut; these were destroyed in a posthumous condemnation of this pharaoh. The architecture of the temple has been considerably altered as a result of misguided reconstruction in the early twentieth century AD.

Architecture

While Hatshepsut used Mentuhotep's temple as a model, the two structures are significantly different. Hatshepsut employed a lengthy colonnaded terrace that deviated from the centralized massing of Mentuhotep's model – an anomaly that may be caused by the decentralized location of her burial chamber.

There are three layered terraces reaching  in height. Each ‘story’ is articulated by a double colonnade of square piers, with the exception of the northwest corner of the central terrace, which employs Proto-Doric columns to house the chapel. 
These terraces are connected by long ramps which were once surrounded by gardens. The layering of Hatshepsut's temple corresponds with the classical Theban form, employing pylon, courts, hypostyle hall, sun court, chapel, and sanctuary.

The relief sculpture within Hatshepsut's temple recites the tale of the divine birth of the pharaoh. The text and pictorial cycle also tell of an expedition to the Land of Punt, an exotic country on the Red Sea coast.

On either side of the entrance to the sanctuary (shown right) are painted pillars with images of Hathor as the capitals. Just under the roof is an image of Wadjet, displayed as a bilateral solar symbol, flanked by two other long serpents.

The temple includes an image, shown to the right, of Hatshepsut depicted as male pharaoh giving offerings to Horus, and to their left, an animal skin wound around a tall staff that is a symbol of the god Osiris.

While the statues and ornamentation have since been stolen or destroyed, the temple once was home to two statues of Osiris, a long avenue lined by sphinxes, as well as many sculptures of pharaoh Hatshepsut in different attitudes – standing, sitting, or kneeling.

Mortuary Temple of Thutmose III

Thutmose III built a temple complex here, dedicated to Amun. Discovered in 1961, it is believed to have been used during the Beautiful festival of the valley. Not much is known about the complex, as it was abandoned after sustaining severe damage during a landslide in the latter Twentieth Dynasty. After that, it was used as a source of building materials and in Christian times became the site of a Coptic cemetery.

Royal and non-royal tombs

A tomb (TT320) in a hidden recess in the cliffs to the south of the temples contained a cache of forty royal mummies, moved there from the Valley of the Kings. The bodies had been placed there by Twenty-first Dynasty priests, most likely to prevent further desecration and looting. The tomb was probably originally built for priests of the 21st Dynasty, most likely the family of Pinedjem II. In the cache were found the mummies of Ahmose I, along with the Eighteenth and Nineteenth dynasty leaders Amenhotep I, Thutmose I, Thutmose II, Thutmose III, Ramesses I, Seti I, Ramesses II, and Ramesses IX. In a separate room were found Twenty-first dynasty High Priests and pharaohs Pinedjem I, Pinedjem II, and Siamun. The discovery of the mummies cache is depicted in the Egyptian movie The Night of Counting the Years (1969).

In 1891, a larger cache of 153 reburied mummies of the priests themselves also were found in a tomb at the site, today known as Bab el-Gasus.

Private tombs dating from the Middle Kingdom through the Ptolemaic period are also situated here. There are two most notable private tombs at Deir el-Bahari. The first is that of Meketre (TT280), which contains many painted wooden funerary models from the Middle Kingdom and the first recorded human-headed canopic jar.

The second, the "secret" tomb of Senenmut – the architect and steward who oversaw the construction of the temple for Hatshepsut – was begun in the complex also. Senenmut's tomb was vandalized in antiquity, but some of the relief artwork is still intact. It was meant to be a very large tomb and its corridors are over 100 yards (92 m) long. However, it was never finished and Senenmut was not interred there. He has another tomb, not far from Deir el-Bahari, where his body may have been placed, but it, too, was vandalized and robbed.

A large area of non-royal tombs in this vicinity is called Sheikh Abd el-Qurna.

Stone chest 
In March 2020 archeologists from Warsaw University’s Institute of Archaeology, led by Andrzej Niwiński, discovered a treasure chest and a wooden box dating back 3,500 years in the Egyptian site of Deir el-Bahari.

The stone chest contained several items, with all of them covered with linen canvas. Three bundles of flax were found during the excavation. A goose skeleton, sacrificed for religious purposes, was found inside one of them. The second one included goose eggs. It is believed that what the third bundle contained was an ibis egg, which had a symbolic meaning for the ancient Egyptians. In addition, a little wooden trinket box was discovered inside the bundle; the box is believed to contain the name Pharaoh Thutmose II.

According to the Andrzej Niwiński, "The chest itself is about 40 cm long, with a slight smaller height. It was perfectly camouflaged, looked like an ordinary stone block. Only after a closer look did it turn out to be a chest."

Terrorism

In 1997, 58 tourists and four Egyptians were massacred at Hatshepsut's mortuary temple by Islamist terrorists from Al-Gama'a al-Islamiyya in what has been called the Luxor massacre, causing a reduction of tourism in the area.

Gallery

See also
List of ancient Egyptian sites
Thebes, Egypt

Sources

 Mertz, Barbara (1964). "Temples, Tombs and Hieroglyphs". New York: Coward-McCann.

References

Publications 
Publications for the excavations conducted by the Egypt Exploration Fund in the 19th and 20th centuries.

External links

Egypt Index at Bluffton University
The Cache at Deir el-BahriArchaeology at About.com
The Temple Djeser djeseru
Hatshepsut: from Queen to Pharaoh, an exhibition catalog from The Metropolitan Museum of Art (fully available online as PDF), which contains material on Deir el-Bahari (see index)

Buildings and structures completed in the 21st century BC
Theban Necropolis
Colonnades
3rd-millennium BC establishments in Egypt
Tourist attractions in Egypt